Wulfstan of Hedeby was a late ninth-century traveller and trader. His travel accounts, as well as those of another trader, Ohthere of Hålogaland, were included in the Old English Orosius. It is unclear if Wulfstan was English or indeed if he was from Hedeby, in today's northern Germany near the city of Schleswig.

According to this account, Wulfstan undertook a journey by sea from Hedeby to the Prussian trading centre of Truso around the year 880. He names the lands the coasts he passes.

This may be the earliest recorded use of the word "Denmark" (Danemearcan). The text of Wulfstan is also one of the earliest attestments of unique traditions and customs of Western Balts – Prussians, called Aesti, and their land called Witland in his text. The purpose of this travel remains unclear; one hypothesis is that King Alfred was interested in having allies against Vikings and therefore looked at Prussians (Aesti) as a potential ally.

References

External links
 The Project Gutenberg Etext of Discovery of Muscovy - The complete texts translated to modern English
  Historia de los Gotlandeses (Guta saga) - The beginning of the original text in Anglo-Saxon can be found in footnote 1

Bibliography  
 Orosius, Paulus, King of England, Alfred, translator Bosworth, J. and editor Hampson, R.T. (1859). King Alfred's Anglo-Saxon version of the Compendious history of the world by Orosius. Containing,--facsimile specimens of the Lauderdale and Cotton mss., a preface describing these mss., etc., an introduction—on Orosius and his work; the Anglo-Saxon text; notes and various readings; a literal English translation, with notes; Mr. Hampson's Essay on King Alfred's geography, and a map of Europe, Asia, and Africa, according to Orosius and Alfred.[online] archive.org. Available at: https://archive.org/stream/kingalfredsangl00boswgoog#page/n0/mode/2up [Accessed 20 May 2018].
 The catalog of Paulus Orosius History of the World - 1859 edition. [online] catalog.hathitrust.org. Available at: https://catalog.hathitrust.org/Record/000114863 [Accessed 20 May 2018].
 Jesch, J. (2018). Who was Wulfstan?. [online] prusaspira.org. Available at: http://www.prusaspira.org/pogezana/Jesch.pdf [Accessed 20 May 2018].
 Englert, A. and Trakadas, A. (2009). Wulfstan's Voyage: The Baltic Sea Region in the early Viking Age as seen from shipboard (Maritime Culture of the North). Roskilde: The Viking Ship Museum. 
 Kemp Malone, On King Alfred's Geographical Treatise, Speculum, Vol. 8, No. 1. (Jan., 1933), pp. 67–78
 Samuel H. Cross, Notes on King Alfred's North: Osti, Este, Speculum, Vol. 6, No. 2. (Apr., 1931), pp. 296–299

Old Prussians
Baltic peoples
9th-century European people
9th-century writers
9th-century merchants
9th-century explorers